Goonlaze is a hamlet in the parish of Stithians, Cornwall, England.

It is also the name of a suburb on the east side of St Agnes, on the north coast of Cornwall.

References

Hamlets in Cornwall